Bezalel Yoel Smotrich (born 27 February 1980) is an Israeli far-right politician and lawyer who has served as the Minister of Finance since 2022. The leader of the Religious Zionist Party, he previously served as a Knesset member for Yamina. He is a resident of Kedumim in the Israeli settlements, which are deemed illegal under international law, in a house within the Israeli occupied territories of the West Bank that was also built illegally outside the settlement proper.

Smotrich's radical beliefs have led to several controversies. He is a supporter of expanding Israeli settlements in the West Bank and opposes Palestinian statehood. Accused of inciting hatred against Arab citizens of Israel, he told Arab Israeli lawmakers in October 2021, that "it's a mistake that Ben-Gurion didn't finish the job and didn't throw you out in 1948." He has called himself a "fascist homophobe", and called gay pride parades to be "worse than bestiality".

Biography

Bezalel Smotrich was born in Haspin, a religious Israeli settlement in the Golan Heights, and grew up in the Beit El settlement, deemed illegal under international law, in the Israeli-occupied West Bank. His last name is derived from the Ukrainian town of Smotrych, where he says his ancestors lived. His grandfather Yaakov immigrated to Mandatory Palestine before World War II and subsequently lost his parents, who drowned on an Aliyah Bet ship trying to reach Palestine, while his grandmother Bruria survived the Holocaust before immigrating to Israel. His grandfather Shimon was a 13th generation native of Jerusalem and his grandmother Sara was born in Metula to a family of Zionist pioneers. 

Smotrich's father was an Orthodox rabbi, and Smotrich received a religious education, attending Mercaz HaRav Kook, Yashlatz, and Yeshivat Kedumim. During his short service in the Israel Defense Forces, he served as a secretary in the Operations Division of the General Staff. He earned a BA in law from Ono Academic College, and began a master's degree in public and international law from the Hebrew University of Jerusalem, though he did not complete it. He is licensed as a lawyer. Smotrich is an Orthodox Jew, and is married to Revital, with whom he has seven children. The family lives outside the Kedumim settlement in the West Bank, in a house that was illegally built outside state land and in breach of the settlement's master plan.

Political activism
According to former Shin Bet deputy chief Yitzhak Ilan, who interrogated him at the time,  on the occasion of  protests against the Israeli disengagement from Gaza, Smotrich was arrested in 2005, while in possession of 700 litres of gasoline, on suspicion of participating in an attempt to blow up Ayalon Highway, a major arterial road. He was held in jail for three weeks,  but not charged after refusing to speak. In 2006, he helped organize the "Beast Parade" as part of protests against a gay pride parade in Jerusalem, although he later admitted regret at the incident.

He is co-founder of the NGO Regavim, which monitors and pursues legal action in the Israeli court system against constructions undertaken by Palestinians, Bedouins, and other Arabs in Israel and the West Bank without Israeli permits.

Political career
In the build-up to the 2015 Knesset elections, he won second place on the Tkuma list, after party leader Uri Ariel. The party ran in the elections as part of the Jewish Home, with Smotrich placed eighth on its list for the elections. He was elected to the Knesset as the party won eight seats. In 2018, he announced that he would challenge Uri Ariel for the leadership of the National Union faction. On 14 January 2019, he defeated Ariel in a landslide victory.

He is said to have played a key role in Israeli legislation to legalize the annexation of Palestinian lands, and a law banning advocates for the Boycott, Divestment, Sanctions movement from visiting Israel.

Smotrich is a co-sponsor of proposed legislation change stating that sources of Jewish religious tradition such as the Torah have to be considered when dealing with legal matters that cannot be decided by legislation or court rulings. Other sponsors of this legislation are Miki Zohar from Likud, Yoav Ben-Tzur from Shas, and Nissan Slomiansky from The Jewish Home.

In June 2019, Smotrich campaigned for the Ministry of Justice, saying that he sought the portfolio to "restore the Torah justice system". Prime Minister Benjamin Netanyahu distanced himself from the comments, and appointed openly gay MK Amir Ohana to the post. According to Channel 13, Smotrich subsequently requested the Ministry of Diaspora Affairs, but was not granted the position, due to fears that he would strain ties between Israel and the Jewish diaspora.

Smotrich initiated legislation which passed in the Knesset calling for government ministers, Knesset members, judges, senior military personnel and police officers to declare their assets every six years.

On 21 November 2022, in a compromise with the Religious Zionist Party, it was reported that Prime Minister-designate Benjamin Netanyahu would appoint Smotrich as Minister of Finance in Netanyahu's incoming government.

In February 2023, he was entrusted with a large part of the administration of the occupied West Bank. His mission is to develop the settlements and unify their administration with that of the Israeli territory. After a Palestinian attack on settlers, he called for “striking the cities of terror and its instigators without mercy, with tanks and helicopters." He said also Israel should act "in a way that conveys that the master of the house has gone crazy.”

Controversies
Smotrich is a supporter of expanding Israeli settlements in the West Bank and opposes Palestinian statehood. On his arrival in Great Britain in February 2022, the Board of Deputies of British Jews tweeted him, telling him to go back where he came from.
In July 2015, Smotrich caused controversy by declaring in a Knesset Interior meeting that developers in Israel should not have to sell homes to Arabs. The meeting took place following accusations that Galil Homes refused to sell homes to Arabs in Ma'alot, a northern Israeli town. Smotrich defended the developer, saying that, "Anyone who wants to protect the Jewish People and opposes mixed marriages is not a racist. Whoever wants to let Jews live a Jewish life without non-Jews is not a racist." He added that Jews are the ones deprived in Israel because "they don't get free land in the Negev", a reference to Bedouin. "I believe in God's words. I prefer that Jews make a living and wouldn't sell a house to Arabs."

In October 2021, he stated to Arab lawmakers that, "You're here by mistake, it's a mistake that Ben-Gurion didn't finish the job and didn't throw you out in 1948."

Smotrich opposes gay marriage, and says that he wants to "promote the traditional family". In 2006, Smotrich helped organize a "beast parade," where participants led goats and donkeys through the streets, in opposition to the Jerusalem gay pride parade. In 2015, he referred to homosexuals as "abnormal", stating: "At home, everyone can be abnormal, and people can form whatever family unit they want. But they can't make demands from me, as the state." In the same discussion, he told the audience: "I am a proud homophobe." He later apologized, and retracted his statement, saying: "Someone shouted from the crowd, and I responded inattentively." In July 2015, after a fatal stabbing attack on the Jerusalem gay pride parade, he referred to the march as an "abomination" and a "beast parade". The following month, Smotrich accused LGBT organizations of controlling the media and silencing those who share his conservative views. Ometz, an Israeli NGO, filed a complaint to the Knesset Ethics Committee to intervene and investigate Smotrich's comments.

In April 2016, Bezalel Smotrich tweeted that he supports segregation of Arab and Jewish women in hospital maternity wards: "It is natural that my wife would not want to lie down next to someone who just gave birth to a baby that might want to murder her baby in another 20 years." The tweets were condemned by several Israeli politicians, including opposition leader Isaac Herzog and Jewish Home leader Naftali Bennett.

In July 2016, Smotrich stated he was "not willing to recognize Reform conversions and their fake religion". The comment came following the passing of a Knesset bill permitting local religious authorities to bar non-Orthodox from using public mikvahs for conversion ceremonies, which countered a Supreme Court ruling to the contrary.

Smotrich has advocated a shoot-to-kill policy for the military when they deal with Palestinians throwing stones. Asked what he would do were another intifada to arise, and a Palestinian child were to throw stones, he replied: "Either I will shoot him, or I will jail him, or I will expel him."

Smotrich has argued that price tag assaults on Palestinian people or property, while criminal in nature, are not to be classified as examples of terrorism, which he defined as "only violence carried out by an enemy within the framework of war against us". Commenting on a specific case, the Duma arson attack, in which a Palestinian family of 3 were killed, and for which a Jewish settler was indicted, Smotrich stated that to brand such deeds as terrorism causes "mortal and unjustified harm to human and civil rights".

In April 2018, Smotrich tweeted that Ahed Tamimi, a 17-year-old Palestinian serving an eight-month jail sentence for assaulting a soldier, incitement, and interfering with a soldier in the line of duty, "should have gotten a bullet, at least in the kneekap". Twitter responded by suspending his account for 12 hours and asking him to delete the tweet, saying that the tweet was "abusive" and could incite harassment. Smotrich refused to delete the tweet, saying that for Twitter, "freedom of speech is only reserved for one side of the political spectrum", and that he stood by his tweet.

In June 2019, while pushing to be appointed Justice minister (just after the previous Justice minister had been fired), Smotrich stated: "We want the justice portfolio because we want to restore the Torah justice system", and that the country should aspire to run itself as "in the days of King David".

In August 2019, Smotrich stated: "We [Orthodox Jews] all would want the State of Israel to be run according to the Torah and Jewish law, it's just that we can't because there are people who think differently from us, and we have to get along with them." The United Right (a political alliance of right-wing parties, including The Jewish Home and Smotrich's Tkuma) referred to the negative reaction as a "media lynching", arguing that Smotrich "emphasized that he cannot and isn't interested in forcing it on others". However, Smotrich had said: "The government makes decisions that affect us and impedes our liberties every day; so, it is simply about what decisions are in the public interest enough to justify coercion... We, too, can force our needs on others, provided we are convinced ourselves of the validity of our demands."

In November 2022, he voiced support for a conspiracy theory that the assassin of late Israeli Prime Minister Yitzhak Rabin was radicalized and incited to carry out the murder by the Shin Bet. Likud MK and former Shin Bet chief Avi Dichter criticized the statement as "unhinged from reality".

According to Ron Ben-Yishai, in his dual role as  Finance Minister  and adjunct Minister in the Ministry of Defense, Smotrich intends to implement ideas set forth in his “Decisive Plan” (2017) which, according to Ben-Yishai, foresees_-.

“ flood(ing), simply so, the areas of Judea and Samaria with settlements and Jewish settlers. When this happens, the Palestinians are supposed to understand that they have no chance to get a state of their own and they would have to choose between one of the three options – a life of subjugation under Israeli rule, emigration or a Shahid [martyr] death”. 

After the 2023 Huwara rampage on February 26, 2023, Smotrich said, on March 1, "I believe that the village of Huwara should be wiped out. I believe that the state of Israel should do so and not, God forbid, ordinary individuals."

In March 2023, Smotrich denied Palestinian identity in remarks decried as “racist, fascist and extremist” by the Palestinian foreign ministry.

References

External links

1980 births
Living people
Deputy Speakers of the Knesset
Government ministers of Israel
Israeli Orthodox Jews
Israeli settlers
Members of the 20th Knesset (2015–2019)
Members of the 21st Knesset (2019)
Members of the 22nd Knesset (2019–2020) 
Members of the 23rd Knesset (2020–2021)
Members of the 24th Knesset (2021–2022)
Members of the 25th Knesset (2022–)
Mercaz HaRav alumni
Ministers of Transport of Israel
Ministers of Finance of Israel
Ono Academic College alumni
Religious Zionist Party leaders
The Jewish Home politicians
Yamina politicians
Jewish fascists